Ray Jui Wu (14 August 1928 – 10 February 2008) was a Chinese-born American geneticist. A pioneer of plant genetic engineering, Wu was Liberty Hyde Bailey Professor of Molecular Genetics and Biology at Cornell University.

Biography
Wu was the son of Hsien and Daisy Yen Wu, both biologists who pioneered biochemical studies in China. Wu was born in Beijing in China; his ancestral hometown was Fuzhou of Fujian Province. Wu was educated in the United States and obtained his Ph.D. in biochemistry from the University of Pennsylvania in 1955.

Wu was a pioneer in DNA sequencing and genetic engineering, and is regarded as one of the founding fathers of plant genetic engineering. In 1970, Wu created the first method for DNA sequencing by using DNA polymerase catalysis and specific nucleotide labeling, which are fundamental to the general sequencing methods today. 

Wu also was an active educator, and created the CUSBEA (China-US Biochemistry Examination and Application). In 1999, at Cornell, Wu donated US $500,000 to establish the Ray Wu Graduate Fellowship in Molecular Biology and Genetics to support biology graduate students.

Wu spent most of his scientific career at Cornell. Wu was an Academician of Academia Sinica (Taiwan), and a Foreign Member of the Chinese Academy of Engineering. Wu's former student Jack W. Szostak was awarded the 2009 Nobel Prize in Physiology or Medicine.

Ray Wu Memorial Fund

The Ray Wu Memorial Fund (RWMF) is a nonprofit 501(c)(3) organization. RWMF administers the annual Ray Wu Prize for Excellence in Life Sciences that is established to inspire Asia's most promising young Ph.D. students to become future leaders in life sciences. For more details, visit the website raywumemorialfund and https://www.cbisociety.org/.

References

External links
 Ray Wu Memorial Symposium
 Ray Wu Faculty Profile @ Cornell University Department of Molecular Biology and Genetics

1928 births
2008 deaths
20th-century American biologists
20th-century American educators
American geneticists
Biologists from Beijing
Chinese emigrants to the United States
Cornell University faculty
Educators from Beijing
Foreign members of the Chinese Academy of Engineering
Members of Academia Sinica
Plant geneticists
University of Pennsylvania School of Arts and Sciences alumni